The 1999–2000 Deutsche Eishockey Liga season was the 6th season of the Deutsche Eishockey Liga.
An agreement was reached between DEL and the 1. Liga. With DEL being the top-level league, it would be known as the DEL - Die 1. Bundesliga, and the 1. Liga as the 2. Bundesliga. A new logo displaying the full name was introduced at the same time.

The regular season was played from September 10, 1999, until March 12, 2000; the playoffs started soon thereafter on March 17. The München Barons, who bought their license from the EV Landshut, became DEL champions.

A number of major changes were introduced this season. One change was the reintroduction of relegation. However, while the Moskitos Essen were to be relegated, they were granted a stay as the Starbulls Rosenheim had to retread due to finance issues.

The second change was that there would be no overtime played; in case a game ends in a tie after the regular periods, shootouts commenced.

Regular season
All teams played each other 4 times, for a total of 56 rounds. The first 8 placed teams qualified for the playoffs.

GP = Games played, W = Win, SOW = Shootout Win, SOL = Shootout Loss, L = Loss
 = Qualified for playoffs  = Continue play to determine relegation

Player Awards

Relegation round
In the relegation round, all teams played each other once and the points were added to the regular season standings.

GP = Games played, W = Win, SOW = Shootout Win, SOL = Shootout Loss, L = Loss
 = Qualified for next season  = Relegation

The Moskitos Essen should have been relegated. However, the Starbulls Rosenheim transferred their DEL license to the  Iserlohner EC and pulled themselves voluntarily out of the league due to financial trouble. The matter went to court and the Moskitos won an order to stay in the league.

Playoff
The playoffs were played in a best-of-five mode.

Quarterfinals
Quarterfinals started March 17, 2000

OT = Overtime; SO = Shootout

Semifinals
Semifinals started April 1 with the regular season best placed team left played against the worst, and the second best vs. third best.

OT = Overtime; SO = Shootout

Finals

Finals started Aprile 22nd, with the Kölner Haie playing home first, due to better regular season placement.

OT = Overtime; SO = Shootout

With the last game, the München Barons became the DEL Champion, winning a German title for the first time in their history.

References

1
Ger
Deutsche Eishockey Liga seasons